Kim Mi-jin (born 22 July 1979) is a former South Korean female volleyball player. She was part of the South Korea women's national volleyball team, competing at the 2004 Summer Olympics in Athens, Greece. She played with Korea Expressway Corporation in 2004.

Clubs
  Korea Expressway Corporation (2004)

See also
 South Korea at the 2004 Summer Olympics

References

External links
Kim Mi Jin at Sports Reference
http://www.gettyimages.com/detail/news-photo/south-korean-volleyball-player-kim-mi-jin-celebrates-a-news-photo/50815765#south-korean-volleyball-player-kim-mijin-celebrates-a-score-against-picture-id50815765

1979 births
Living people
South Korean women's volleyball players
Place of birth missing (living people)
Volleyball players at the 2004 Summer Olympics
Olympic volleyball players of South Korea
Volleyball players at the 2002 Asian Games
Asian Games medalists in volleyball
Asian Games silver medalists for South Korea
Medalists at the 2002 Asian Games